Thomas Finegan (May 8, 1852 – August 9, 1921) was an American manufacturer and politician from New York.

Life 
Finegan was born on May 8, 1852 in Haverstraw, New York. His parents were machinist James Finegan and Catherine McManus, Irish immigrants from County Monaghan.

When he was 15, Finegan worked in various capacities under brick manufacturers Wood & Keenan. He then worked in boating and railroading in different parts of the country. This was followed by working as a bricklayer on several big public projects across the country, including the Brooklyn Bridge, the New York State Capitol, and the Chicago Sewage Project.

In 1881, Finegan returned to Haverstraw and opened a retail cigar store. A year later, he purchased a mineral water business. In 1895, he began brewing ale and porter, and in 1900 he started brewing lager beer as well. In 1891, he leased a brickyard and started manufacturing bricks. He was also involved with real estate in Haverstraw and neighboring town of Stony Point. He served as town assessor for Haverstraw.

In 1891, Finegan was elected to the New York State Assembly as a Democrat, representing Rockland County. He served in the Assembly in 1892, 1893, and 1903.

Finegan's wife was Julia Kohler. Their children were Mrs. Thomas Gagan, Julia, Regis, James E., and Thomas Jr. He was a member of the Foresters of America.

Finegan died on August 9, 1921. He was buried in St. Peter's Cemetery.

References

External links 
 The Political Graveyard
 Thomas Finegan at Find a Grave

1852 births
1921 deaths
People from Haverstraw, New York
American people of Irish descent
19th-century American politicians
20th-century American politicians
Democratic Party members of the New York State Assembly
American real estate brokers
American brewers
Businesspeople from New York (state)
American manufacturing businesspeople
American industrialists
Burials in New York (state)